The 2021–22 Brentford F.C. season was the club's 132nd season in existence and first season in the Premier League, the top tier of English football. Brentford also competed in the FA Cup and the EFL Cup. The season covers the period from 1 July 2021 to 30 June 2022. Brentford secured promotion to the Premier League on 29 May 2021, following a 2–0 victory against Swansea City in the play-off final at Wembley, confirming the club's top flight status for the first time in 74 years.

First team squad

 Players' ages are as of the opening day of the 2021–22 season.

Transfers

Transfers in

Loans in

Loans out

Transfers out

Pre-season and friendlies

Competitions

Overview

Premier League

League table

Results summary

Results by round

Matches

FA Cup

EFL Cup

Statistics

Appearances and goals

 Source: Soccerbase

Goalscorers 

Source: Soccerbase

Discipline 

 Source: ESPN

International caps 

Only international caps won while contracted to Brentford are counted.

Awards 

 Supporters' Player of the Year: Christian Nørgaard
 Players' Player of the Year: Christian Nørgaard
 FA Cup Team of the Round: Bryan Mbeumo (third round)
 EFL Cup Team of the Tournament: Marcus Forss, Saman Ghoddos
 EFL Cup Team of the Round:
Marcus Forss, Charlie Goode, Yoane Wissa (third round)
Ivan Toney (fourth round)
EFL Cup Goal of the Tournament: Yoane Wissa
EFL Cup Goal of the Round: Yoane Wissa (third round)

See also
 2021–22 in English football
 List of Brentford F.C. seasons

References 

Brentford F.C. seasons
Brentford
Brentford
Brentford